Radio SRF Virus is a radio station from Schweizer Radio und Fernsehen (SRF). The station was launched in 1999 (as DRS Virus) and is broadcast on cable and DAB+ in German-speaking Switzerland as well as throughout Europe on satellite and worldwide via the Internet.

The station serves to provide an alternative music choice to Radio SRF 3.

Former logos

External links

1999 establishments in Switzerland
Radio stations established in 1999
German-language radio stations in Switzerland